The World Figure Skating Championships is an annual figure skating competition sanctioned by the International Skating Union in which figure skaters compete for the title of World Champion.

The 1962 competitions for men's singles, ladies' singles, pair skating, and ice dance took place from March 14 to 17 in Prague, Czechoslovakia. The Figure Skating World Championships in Prague were originally planned for 1961, but were cancelled due to the crash of Sabena Flight 548, which killed everyone on board the plane, including the entire US figure skating team.

East Germany participated in the World Figure Skating Championships for the first time.

This competition is best remembered for Donald Jackson's come-from-behind victory in the men's event with a tour-de-force free skating that included the first triple lutz jump ever landed in competition as well as a triple salchow jump and 20 other double and single jumps, including jumps in opposite directions and jumps with variations in arm position or delayed rotation. Jackson received 7 perfect 6.0 scores for this performance.

Prague hometown favorites Eva Romanová / Pavel Roman won the dance event - breaking the British domination of this discipline - and Canadians Maria Jelinek / Otto Jelinek were the winners in the pairs. As children, the Jelineks had defected from Czechoslovakia with their parents after the post-war Communist takeover, and there were significant fears for their safety in returning to their home country. The "official" story that had been circulated at the time of the previous year's planned competition was that they were merely of Czech descent. The Jelineks' chief competitors, 1960 runners-up Marika Kilius / Hans-Jürgen Bäumler, were forced to withdraw from the competition after colliding on side-by-side jumps during their program, and the silver medal was won by Ludmila Belousova / Oleg Protopopov.

Results

Men

Judges:
 Franz Wojtanowskyj 
 N. Gregory 
 Milan Duchon 
 Jeannie Donnier-Blanc 
 E. K. Bauch 
 Adolf Walker 
 Pamela Davis 
 A. Koutny 
 Georgi Felitsin

Ladies

Judges:
 Martin Felsenreich 
 Melville Rogers 
 H. Dudová 
 J. Donnier-Blanc 
 E. K. Bauch 
 A. Koutny 
 C. P. Engelfriet 
 Adolf Walker 
 M. Drake

Pairs

Judges:
 Hans Meixner 
 Melville Rogers 
 Vera Spurná 
 E. K. Bauch 
 Adolf Walker 
 Pamela Davis 
 J. Creux 
 M. Drake 
 Tatiana Tolmacheva

Ice dance

Judges:
 Hans Meixner 
 N. Gregory 
 Emil Skákala 
 L. Lauret 
 H. Wollersen 
 Pamela Davis 
 Ferenc Kertész 
 Eugene Kirchhofer 
 M. Drake

References

Sources
 Result List provided by the ISU

World Figure Skating Championships
World Figure Skating Championships
World Figure Skating Championships
World Figure Skating Championships
International figure skating competitions hosted by Czechoslovakia
Sports competitions in Prague
1960s in Prague
World Figure Skating Championships